Common man may refer to:

 Commoner (or common people)
 The Common Man, a cartoon character by R. K. Laxman for "You Said It" in The Times of India 
 The Common Man (film) (Dupont Lajoie), a 1975 French film
 A Common Man (film), a 2011 film starring Ben Cross and Ben Kingsley
 Common Man, 1997 Indian TV movie with Shreeram Lagoo and Sulabha Deshpande
 "Common Man", a song by John Conlee
"Common Man", a song by David Ruffin from his eponymous 1973 album
"Common Man", Zambian protest song by P.K. Chishala
 Fanfare for the Common Man, a 20th-century American classical music work by Aaron Copland

See also 
 Common Man's Front (Italian, Fronte dell'Uomo Qualunque), a short-lived right-wing populist, monarchist and anti-communist political party in Italy